Quảng Phúc is a ward (phường) of Ba Đồn town, Quảng Bình Province, Vietnam.

Populated places in Quảng Bình province
Communes of Quảng Bình province